Bonnie Court is a bungalow court located at 140 S. Bonnie Ave. in Pasadena, California. The court consists of six identical homes arranged around a central path. The court was built from 1922 to 1924, during a building boom for bungalow courts. The houses within the court were designed in the Colonial Revival style, a popular design for small homes; the design can be seen in the homes' entrance porticos with supporting columns and their jerkinhead roofs. The court is representative of the detached narrow, or open, form of bungalow courts.

The court was listed on the National Register of Historic Places on November 15, 1994.

See also
National Register of Historic Places listings in Pasadena, California

References

Bungalow courts
Bungalow architecture in California
Houses in Pasadena, California
Houses completed in 1924
Houses on the National Register of Historic Places in California
National Register of Historic Places in Pasadena, California